James Ware Bradbury (June 10, 1802January 6, 1901) was a United States Senator from Maine.

Born in Parsonsfield, Maine, he attended the common schools and Gorham Academy. After graduating from Bowdoin College in 1825, he became principal of Hallowell Academy and founder of the first normal school in New Hampshire, at Effingham, New Hampshire, in 1829.

He then studied law, was admitted to the bar and commenced practice in Augusta, Maine, in 1830. There he was for a time editor of the Maine Patriot, and was prosecuting attorney for the county from 1834 until 1838.  He was a member of the Baltimore convention of 1844, which nominated James K. Polk for the presidency.

He was elected in 1846 as a Democrat to the United States Senate and served from March 4, 1847, until March 3, 1853, when he declined to be a candidate for reelection (returning, at the close of his term, to the practice of his profession). While in the Senate he chaired the U.S. Senate Committee on Printing and the U.S. Senate Committee on Retrenchment. He was chairman of a select committee on French spoliations.

He served as a trustee of Bowdoin College in 1861 and was corresponding secretary of the Maine Historical Society and then president of that body from 1867 to 1887.

See also 
New Hampshire Historical Marker No. 83: First Normal School in New Hampshire

References

Sources

 
 Bio of James S. Bradbury: As found in Representative Men of Maine

1802 births
1901 deaths
Maine Democrats
Maine lawyers
Bowdoin College alumni
19th-century American newspaper editors
Democratic Party United States senators from Maine
People from Parsonsfield, Maine
People from Augusta, Maine
19th-century American politicians